Sam Stockman (born 19 May 1982) is an English actor and musician, whose most notable acting role is as DC Emerson Kent on the UK crime drama Whitechapel from 2009 to 2013.

Acting career
Stockman began acting at the age of 10 in the independent film B&B. Since then he has also appeared on the UK soap Family Affairs, several episodes of Holby City as the troubled drug addict James Hope, in the 1999 film Don't Go Breaking My Heart, the 2011 Christmas special of Doctor Who and the 2011 film The Task. He appeared in the acclaimed UK crime drama Whitechapel as DC Emerson Kent for the duration of the series, between 2009 and 2013.

Filmography

Musicianship
While maintaining a successful acting career, Stockman also relentlessly pursued his passion for music. For a time he made up one quarter of the band Shepherd's Pi, along with Claire Russell and former Family Affairs co-stars Angela Hazeldine and his on-screen brother, Rupert Hill. The band later split over musical differences.

Stockman and Hazeldine went on to form The Circus Electric. The band released a debut LP and played gigs across the country to positive reviews. The band, despite its success, was disbanded in pursuit of something new.

Stockman is now a member of the band Colour of Bone.

References

External links

Sam Stockman showreel

1982 births
Living people
English male child actors
English male musicians
English male soap opera actors